Thierry Jacob (born 8 March 1965), is a French former professional boxer who competed between 1984 and 1994.

Professional career

Jacob turned professional in 1984 & amassed a record of 26-2 before he unsuccessfully fought Venezuelan boxer José Sanabria, for the IBF super bantamweight world title. Jacob would get another opportunity at a world title nearly four years later, this time facing & defeating Mexican boxer Daniel Zaragoza, to win the WBC world title. Jacob would lose the title in his first defense to American boxer Tracy Harris Patterson.

Professional boxing record

Personal life
Jacob has two sons Romain & Joffrey, who are also professional boxers.

See also
Notable boxing families
List of world super-bantamweight boxing champions

References

External links

 

|-

1965 births
Living people
French male boxers
Sportspeople from Calais
European Boxing Union champions
Bantamweight boxers
World super-bantamweight boxing champions
World Boxing Council champions